The 2022–2023 Bikarkeppni karla, named Vís bikarinn for sponsorship reasons, was the 57th edition of the Icelandic Men's Basketball Cup, won by Valur against Stjarnan. The competition was managed by the Icelandic Basketball Association (KKÍ) and the final four was played in Laugardalshöll, Reykjavík, and broadcast live on RÚV. Kári Jónsson was named the Cup Finals MVP after turning in 22 points and 7 assists.

Bracket

Cup Finals MVP

References

External links
2022–2023 Tournament results

Men's Cup
2022–23 in European basketball leagues